Ragnar Pedersen (28 April 1906 – 7 September 1984) was a Norwegian footballer. He played in six matches for the Norway national football team from 1932 to 1933.

References

External links
 

1906 births
1984 deaths
Norwegian footballers
Norway international footballers
Place of birth missing
Association footballers not categorized by position